
Wschowa County is a unit of territorial administration and local government (powiat) in Lubusz Voivodeship, western Poland. It was created in 2002 out of three gminas which previously belonged to Nowa Sól County.

As of 2019 its total population is 38,960, out of which the population of Wschowa is 13,875, that of Sława is 4,321, that of Szlichtyngowa is 1,278, and the rural population is 19,486.

Neighbouring counties
Wschowa County is bordered by Wolsztyn County to the north, Leszno County to the east, Góra County to the south-east, Głogów County to the south-west and Nowa Sól County to the west.

Administrative division
The county is subdivided into three gminas (all urban-rural, centred on the three towns). These are listed in the following table (in descending order of population).

References

 
Wschowa